Stenasellidae is a family of isopods belonging to the order Isopoda.

Genera:
 Acanthastenasellus Chelazzi & Messana, 1985
 Balkanostenasellus Cvetkov, 1975
 Etlastenasellus Argano, 1977
 Johanella Monod, 1924
 Johannella Monod, 1924
 Magniezia Lanza, 1966
 Metastenasellus Magniez, 1966
 Mexistenasellus Cole & W. L. Minckley, 1972
 Parastenasellus Magniez, 1966
 Protelsonia Méhely, 1924
 Stenasellus Dollfus, 1897

References

Isopoda